Henry William West (27 March 1917 – 5 February 2004) was a politician in Northern Ireland who served as leader of the Ulster Unionist Party from 1974 until 1979.

Career to Stormont
West was born in County Fermanagh and educated at Portora Royal School in Enniskillen. He worked as a farmer, taking an interest in local government, but it was not until 1954 that he entered Stormont as member for the Enniskillen seat, succeeding Thomas Nelson. In 1960 he was appointed Minister of Agriculture in the government of Lord Brookeborough, which he was to retain under the leadership of Terence O'Neill.

He became one of a number of Stormont MPs critical of O'Neill's conciliatory approach towards Nationalists and in 1969 he had the whip withdrawn, along with William Craig. In 1971 the whip was restored under the new Ulster Unionist leader and Prime Minister of Northern Ireland Brian Faulkner. West became Minister of Agriculture once more and retained that position until the Stormont government was dissolved in 1972.

Sunningdale
West emerged as a fierce critic of the negotiations that would lead to the Sunningdale Agreement, and led the "anti-White Paper" Unionists in the Northern Ireland Assembly, 1973. When in January 1974 the Ulster Unionist Council voted against Faulkner's course of action the latter was forced into resignation. West succeeded him as leader of the party and sought to regain much of the support that the party had lost to breakaway and other Unionist groupings. In the February 1974 general election West negotiated the United Ulster Unionist Coalition with the Vanguard Progressive Unionist Party, led by Craig, and the Democratic Unionist Party, led by Ian Paisley, which would put up a single anti-Sunningdale Unionist candidate in all twelve constituencies on a platform of abolishing the power-sharing executive. West himself stood in Fermanagh and South Tyrone and won, albeit due to a split nationalist vote.

The UUUC campaigned fiercely for the abolition of the executive, which came about in May 1974 following a general strike. West continued to seek ways to expand unionism and recruited the ex-Conservative Member of Parliament Enoch Powell to the party.  Powell stood for and won the South Down constituency in the October 1974 general election, but his opposition to the restoration of Stormont and preference for greater integration with the United Kingdom was to cause ruptures within the party.  West himself lost his seat in Parliament due to a pact between Nationalists, so having the dubious distinction of being the only MP who served between the two general elections in 1974 who never served in any other Parliament, but he remained leader of the party.  The UUUC lasted another few years and won the overwhelming majority of the seats in the 1975 Northern Ireland Constitutional Convention which sought to gain consensus on the future of the province.  When the Vanguard Party fell apart over proposals for a voluntary coalition with the Social Democratic and Labour Party, West negotiated with Craig for the majority faction to merge into the Ulster Unionists.

The 1979 general election was relatively disappointing for the Ulster Unionists, as they won only five of the province's twelve constituencies.  In June 1979 West stood as one of two candidates in the first elections to the European Parliament.  However he was unsuccessful in the Single Transferable Vote constituency for the entire province and had the personal humiliations of seeing rival DUP leader Ian Paisley top the poll, fellow Ulster Unionist John Taylor win one of the seats and former Ulster Unionist member James Kilfedder performing better than West to become runner up. West resigned shortly afterwards.

April 1981 by-election in Fermanagh and South Tyrone 
He remained active in the Ulster Unionists for some years and was the party's unsuccessful candidate in the bitter April 1981 by-election in Fermanagh and South Tyrone caused by the death of the sitting MP Frank Maguire, West received 29,046 votes and was defeated by Bobby Sands standing on an Anti-H-Block/Armagh Political Prisoner ticket with 30,493 votes; Sands died twenty-six days after his election.  West was considered to have fought a lacklustre campaign, and the UUP chose Ken Maginnis instead to fight the second by-election; although he did not win he was considered to have fought a more dynamic campaign.  Afterwards West remained a member of the Ulster Unionist Council and was highly critical of his successor, James Molyneaux, for his opposition to proposals for power sharing devolution.

Family
He was married to Maureen Hall and they had four sons and three daughters. He was a Presbyterian.

His nephew is James Cooper, who was chairman of the Ulster Unionist Party from 2003 to 2005 and unsuccessfully was the Party's candidate in Fermanagh and South Tyrone in 2001.

See also
 List of United Kingdom MPs with the shortest service

References

External links 
 
 Guardian obituary

1917 births
2004 deaths
Leaders of the Ulster Unionist Party
Ulster Unionist Party members of the House of Commons of Northern Ireland
Members of the House of Commons of Northern Ireland 1953–1958
Members of the House of Commons of Northern Ireland 1958–1962
Members of the House of Commons of Northern Ireland 1962–1965
Members of the House of Commons of Northern Ireland 1965–1969
Members of the House of Commons of Northern Ireland 1969–1973
Members of the House of Commons of Northern Ireland for County Fermanagh constituencies
Members of the Northern Ireland Assembly 1973–1974
Members of the Northern Ireland Constitutional Convention
Northern Ireland junior government ministers (Parliament of Northern Ireland)
Northern Ireland Cabinet ministers (Parliament of Northern Ireland)
Members of the Privy Council of Northern Ireland
Members of the Parliament of the United Kingdom for Fermanagh and South Tyrone (since 1950)
Ulster Unionist Party members of the House of Commons of the United Kingdom
UK MPs 1974
People of The Troubles (Northern Ireland)
People educated at Portora Royal School
Politicians from County Fermanagh
Farmers from Northern Ireland
Presbyterians from Northern Ireland
High Sheriffs of County Fermanagh